The 1991 Dutch Open was a men's tennis tournament played on outdoor clay courts in Hilversum in the Netherlands that was part of the World Series of the 1991 ATP Tour. It was the 33rd edition of the tournament and was held from 22 July until 28 July 1991. Fourth-seeded Magnus Gustafsson won the singles title

Finals

Singles

 Magnus Gustafsson defeated  Jordi Arrese, 5–7, 7–6(7–2), 2–6, 6–1, 6–0
 It was Gustafsson's 3rd individual title of the year, and the 3rd of his career.

Doubles

 Richard Krajicek /  Jan Siemerink defeated  Francisco Clavet /  Magnus Gustafsson, 7–5, 6–4

References

External links
 ITF tournament edition details